The passamezzo antico is a ground bass or chord progression that was popular during the Italian Renaissance and known throughout Europe in the 16th century. The progression is a variant of the double tonic: its major mode variant is known as the passamezzo moderno.

The sequence consists of two phrases as follows: (For an explanation of this notation see Chord progression)

Though usually in the key of G minor, in the key of A minor this gives:

The romanesca is a variant of the passamezzo antico, where the first chord is the III (e.g., a C major chord in A minor). A famous example is "Greensleeves". 

The passamezzo antico chord changes are found, knowingly or not, in modern popular music culture: Carrie Underwood's debut album Some Hearts has two examples, "Before He Cheats" (a big U.S. hit in 2006) and "Starts with Goodbye".

Sources

Chord progressions